"For Tonight" is a song by American singer-songwriter Giveon. It was released on September 24, 2021, through Epic Records, as the lead single from his debut studio album Give or Take (2022). The song was produced by Sevn Thomas, Jahaan Sweet, and Akeel Henry.

Background
In a press release, Giveon stated: "For Tonight is the story of a taboo vice that I just can't seem to stop indulging in".

It is written in the key of A major, with a tempo of 80 beats per minute.

Music video
An accompanying video was released on September 24, 2021, and directed by Sophia Nahli Allison. The first half depicts Giveon and his love interest in separate scenes before they are shown walking towards one another. It subsequently shows scenes of the couple "having 'one of those conversations' on a rainy night, followed by clips of them lying together underneath the stars".

Live performance
On September 30, 2021, Giveon performed the song on The Tonight Show Starring Jimmy Fallon.

Credits and personnel
Credits adapted from Tidal.

 Giveon – composer, lyricist, associated performer
 Akeel Henry – producer
 Jahaan Sweet – producer
 Sevn Thomas – producer, composer, lyricist
 Marcus Semaj – composer, lyricist
 Tony Dixon – composer, lyricist
 Jonathan Lopez Garcia – assistant engineer
 Brian Cruz – engineer, recording engineer
 Colin Leonard – mastering engineer
 Leon Thomas – miscellaneous producer
 Peter Lee Johnson – miscellaneous producer
 John Kercy – mix engineer

Charts

Weekly charts

Year-end charts

Certifications

Release history

Awards
Henry won the Jack Richardson Producer of the Year Award at the Juno Awards of 2023 for his work on "For Tonight" and John Legend's "Splash".

References

2021 songs
2021 singles
Epic Records singles
Giveon songs
Songs written by Giveon
Songs written by Sevn Thomas
American contemporary R&B songs
American soul songs